The SC 1800 (Sprengbombe Cylindrisch 1800) or cylindrical explosive bomb was a general-purpose bomb used by the Luftwaffe during World War II.

Design 
The SC 1800 had a single piece forged and machined steel body and was similar to the preceding SC 1200 in construction. The bomb was usually filled with a mixture of 40% amatol and 60% Trotyl, but when used as an anti-shipping bomb it was filled with Trialen 105, a mixture of 15% hexogen, 70% Trotyl and 15% aluminium powder. The SC 1800 had a single transverse fuze unlike the central fuze of the SC 1200.  The SC 1800 tail assembly had four diagonally braced tail fins while the SC 1800B had a circular braced tail ring.  Inside the bomb casing there was a reinforced H-type suspension lug and it could be horizontally suspended in a bomb bay or horizontally mounted on a fuselage hardpoint.

References

World War II aerial bombs of Germany
Military equipment introduced in the 1940s